Liván Moinelo Pita (born December 8, 1995) is a Cuban professional baseball pitcher for Vegueros de Pinar del Rio in the Cuban National Series. He was dispatched to the Fukuoka SoftBank Hawks in 2017.

Career
Moinelo played for the Cuban national baseball team at the 2015 Pan American Games, 2015 Premier 12 and 2017 World Baseball Classic.

Fukuoka SoftBank Hawks

2017–2020 season
On May 10, 2017, the Government of Cuba signed a contract to dispatch Moinelo and Oscar Colas to the Fukuoka SoftBank Hawks as a developmental player. From May 28, 2017, he played on the Western League, one of the two minor league teams in the NPB. On June 16 of the same year, Moinelo signed a 20 million yen contract with the Fukuoka SoftBank Hawks as a registered player under control. On June 27, he pitched his debut game against the Hokkaido Nippon-Ham Fighters as a relief pitcher. On July 2, he won a game as a relief pitcher for the first time in the Pacific League. In 2017 season, he finished the regular season as a Setup man with 34 games pitched, a 4–3 Win–loss record, a 2.52 ERA, 15 holds, 1 save, and 36 strikeouts in  innings. He pitched as a setup man in the postseason, and he pitched well in the 2017 Pacific League Climax Series against Tohoku Rakuten Golden Eagles and the 2017 Japan Series against Yokohama DeNA BayStars, and contributed to the Hawks' Japan Series championship victory.

In the 2018 season, Moinelo finished the regular season with 49 games pitched, a 5–1 Win–loss record, a 4.53 ERA, 13 holds, 1 save, and 57 strikeouts in  innings.  And in the postseason, he pitched as a setup man in the 2018 Pacific League Climax Series against Saitama Seibu Lions and the 2018 Japan Series against Hiroshima Toyo Carp, and contributed to the team's second consecutive Japan Series championship.

In the 2019 season, Moinelo finished the regular season with 60 Games pitched, a 3–1 Win–loss record, a 1.52 ERA, 34 holds, 4 saves, and 86 strikeouts in  innings. And in the postseason, he pitched as a setup man in the 2019 Pacific League Climax Series against Saitama Seibu Lions and the 2019 Japan Series against Yomiuri Giants, and contributed to the team's third consecutive Japan Series championship. On October 8, he was selected by the Cuba national baseball team for 2019 WBSC Premier12.

In the 2020 season, Moinelo finished the regular season with 50 Games pitched, a 2–3 Win–loss record, a 1.69 ERA, a 38 Holds (League Holds leader), a one Save, a 77 strikeouts in 48 innings. And he recorded his career high with K9 (14.44) and AVG (.164). In the 2020 Japan Series against the Yomiuri Giants, He pitched in three games as a Setup man, scoring no hits, no runs and 8 strikeouts, contributing to the team's fourth consecutive Japan Series champion. On December 17, Moinelo was honored for the Pacific League Best Relief Pitcher Award at the NPB AWARD 2020.

2021 season–present
In 2021 season, Moinelo finished the regular season with 33 Games pitched, a 1–0 Win–loss record, a 1.15 ERA, a 14 Holds, a 5 Saves, and a 42 strikeouts in 31.1 innings.

On January 27, 2022, Moinelo re-signed a three-year contract with the Hawks for an annual salary of 300 million yen.

In 2022 season, he finished the regular season with 53 Games pitched, a 1–1 Win–loss record, a 1.03 ERA, a 8 Holds, a 24 Saves, and a 87 strikeouts in 52.2 innings.

References

External links

Team Roster Listing Fukuoka SoftBank Hawks Moinelo, Livan NPB.jp
35 Livan Moinelo PLAYERS2022 - Fukuoka SoftBank Hawks Official site

1995 births
Living people
Baseball players at the 2015 Pan American Games
Baseball players at the 2019 Pan American Games
Cuban expatriate baseball players in Japan
Fukuoka SoftBank Hawks players
Nippon Professional Baseball pitchers
Pan American Games bronze medalists for Cuba
Sabuesos de Holquin players
Vegueros de Pinar del Rio players
2017 World Baseball Classic players
2023 World Baseball Classic players
Pan American Games medalists in baseball
Medalists at the 2015 Pan American Games
People from Pinar del Río